Atterbury Creek is a stream in the U.S. state of South Dakota.

Atterbury Creek has the name of a local family which settled there.

See also
List of rivers of South Dakota

References

Rivers of Harding County, South Dakota
Rivers of South Dakota